Disrupt was an American crust punk band from Lynn, Massachusetts, that was active from 1987 to 1993.

History 
The band's initial lineup was Jay Stiles and Pete Kamarinos (vocals), Chris Drake (guitar), Harry Haralabatos (drums), Tony Leone (bass). After recording one rehearsal demo, Leone and Haralabatos left the band. Brad Jones (drums) and Mike Williams (guitar) joined in the spring of 1988. However, Jones left the band a couple of months later, and Williams started playing drums. With this lineup, and with Stiles also playing bass, they recorded a demo, entitled Millions Die For Moneymaking, in November 1988. 

In the spring of 1989, Williams and Drake left the band. Haralabatos rejoined the band, in order to record songs that were supposed to be on a split 7-inch with Extreme Noise Terror. They also recruited Scott Lucid to play bass. In October, they recorded a 5-song demo, which was lated re-released as a 7" self-titled EP in 1990. 

That year, Scott Lucid left the band, and they acquired Bob Palombo to replace him. With Chris Drake rejoining the band, and Terry Savastano from the band Spasm contributing guitar duties, the band recorded an 8-song album entitled Refuse Planet, which was released as a 7" single by Relapse Records in 1991. Disrupt recorded another split 7" with Destroy in January of that year.

Drake left the band again in 1991, and was replaced by Jeff Hayward (Unleashed Anger) on second guitar. About a week after Jeff joined the band, Haralabatos also quit, and Randy Odierno (of Temporary Insanity) replaced him. 

With this lineup, the band entered the studio in 1992, and recorded songs for split releases with Disdain, Resist, Tuomiopaivan Lapset, and Taste of Fear. In addition, they also released a live 7" entitled Smash Divisions, taken from a concert in New Haven, Connecticut the year prior. In November 1992, they entered One World Studios in Massachusetts, with producer Bill T. Miller and recorded 30 songs for the Unrest album. They also re-recorded 10 older tracks, which was then released as a 7" single entitled Deprived.

Disrupt toured Europe in October/November 1993. After the tour, they broke up due to personal and musical differences. The Unrest album was released on Relapse in August 1994.

In 2007, Relapse released a seventy-eight song discography 2-CD set containing all of the 7-inches, split LP + rare rehearsals, Millions die for Moneymaking demo and live tracks in 2007. Also released was a box set which included the Unrest CD, discography 2-CD set, and a DVD. This was a limited to 1000 copies. The seven unreleased songs that were left over from the Lanes session were released on a 12-inch on Unrest records out of Canada. The band acquired a cult following on the strength of several underground 7-inch EPs and compilation appearances. Their lyrics were politically anarchist, expressing animal rights and anti-capitalist views.

Members of the band have gone on to play in many other bands since the dissolution of Disrupt, including Consume, Deathraid, Grief, State of Fear, Chicken Chest and the Bird Boys and also pure noise bands such as Goff, Demonic Death Preachers, and Effects of Alcohol.

Band members 
Jay Stiles – vocals, bass, guitar (1987–1993)
Pete Kamarinos – vocals (1987–1993)
Chris Drake – guitar (1987-1989,1990-1991)
Harry Haralabatos – drums (1987–1988, 1989–1991)
Tony Leone – bass (1987)
Brad Jones – drums (1988)
Mike Williams – guitar, drums (1988–1989)
Scott Lucid – bass (1989–1990)
Terry Savastano – guitar (1990–1993)
Bob Palombo – bass (1990–1993)
Jeff Hayward – guitar (1991–1993)
Randy Odierno – drums (1991–1993)
Alyssa Murry – vocals (1992)
Kendal Treffery – guitar (1990)

Discography 
Millions Die for Moneymaking demo, 1988
self-titled EP, 1990
Refuse Planet EP, 1991
split EP with Destroy, 1991
split EP with Disdain, 1992
split EP with Resist, 1992
split EP with Tuomiopäivän Lapset, 1992
split EP with Taste of Fear, 1992
Smash Divisions EP, 1992
split LP with Sauna, 1993
Unrest LP, 1994 (reissued/remastered for CD in 2008 with 30 tracks)
Deprived EP, 1994
split EP with Warcollapse, 1995
self-titled LP, 2008

Compilation appearances 
Son of Bllleeaaauuurrrrggghhh!, 1992
Crust and Anguished, 1992
Apocalyptic Convulsions, 1992
Death... Is Just the Beginning III''', 1994Corporate Death, 1994Heavy Hardcore Headroom, 1996Grind Your Mind'', 2007

References

External links 
 Myspace of Disrupt
 Interview of the singer Pete Kamarinos for the Resound magazine

American crust and d-beat groups
Relapse Records artists
American grindcore musical groups
Hardcore punk groups from Massachusetts